The scarlet-bellied mountain tanager (Anisognathus igniventris) is a species of bird in the family Thraupidae. It is found in Andean forest, woodland and shrub in Bolivia, Colombia, Ecuador, Peru, and Venezuela. It is sometimes split into two species: The scarlet-bellied mountain tanager (A. lunulatus) ranging north from central Peru, and the fire-bellied mountain tanager (A. igniventris) ranging south from central Peru. The latter has a lighter, more orangish belly than the former.

References

scarlet-bellied mountain tanager
Birds of the Northern Andes
scarlet-bellied mountain tanager
Taxonomy articles created by Polbot